Growing Up Is Getting Old may refer to:

 Growing Up Is Getting Old (album), 2009 album by American singer Jason Michael Carroll
 "Growing Up Is Getting Old" (song), 2021 song by Bulgarian singer Victoria Georgieva